Ricks Road is the third album by Scottish rock band Texas. The album was released on 1 November 1993 by Mercury Records. The album peaked at number 18 in the UK and spent two weeks on the UK Albums Chart. It was certified Silver (for 60,000 copies sold) by the British Phonographic Industry in October 1997.  In Australia, the album peaked at number 96 on the ARIA Albums Chart.

The album included three UK Top 40 singles; "So Called Friend" (#30), "You Owe It All to Me" (#39), and "So in Love with You" (#28).

Track listing
All songs written by Johnny McElhone and Sharleen Spiteri except as indicated.

International release

US/Canadian release
 "So Called Friend"
 "Fade Away"
 "Listen to Me"
 "You Owe It All to Me"
 "Beautiful Angel"
 "So in Love with You"
 "You've Got to Live a Little"
 "I Want to Go to Heaven"
 "Hear Me Now"
 "Fearing These Days"
 "Tired of Being Alone" (Al Green)
 "Winters End"

Personnel
Texas
Sharleen Spiteri – vocals, guitar
Ally McErlaine – guitar
Johnny McElhone – bass
Eddie Campbell – piano, Wurlitzer, B3 organ, backing vocals 
Richard Hynd – drums, percussion

Other personnel
 Assistant engineers – Chris Laidlan, Matt Westfield, Pete Lewis
 Engineering and mixing – Ed Thacker
 Mastering – Bob Ludwig
 Producer – Paul Fox
 String arrangements – Campbell, Jimmy Z, McElhone, Fox

Charts

Certifications and sales

References

1993 albums
Texas (band) albums
Mercury Records albums
Vertigo Records albums
Albums produced by Paul Fox (record producer)